School districts named Liberty County School District in the U.S. include:

Liberty County School District (Florida)
Liberty County School District (Georgia)